Attila Szakály (born 30 June 1992) is a Hungarian football player who plays for Siófok.

Club statistics

Updated to games played as of 27 June 2020.

References
HLSZ
MLSZ

1992 births
Living people
People from Körmend
Hungarian footballers
Association football midfielders
Szombathelyi Haladás footballers
Zalaegerszegi TE players
Kaposvári Rákóczi FC players
BFC Siófok players
Nemzeti Bajnokság I players
Nemzeti Bajnokság II players
Nemzeti Bajnokság III players
Hungary under-21 international footballers
Sportspeople from Vas County
21st-century Hungarian people